Kiss Kiss Bang Bang is an EP by Glassjaw originally released in 1997 on 2 Cents A Pop label. In 2001, it was re-released without a label attached to it.

It was recorded at Brass Giraffe Studio in New York when vocalist Daryl Palumbo was 18 years old.

Track listing
All lyrics written by Daryl Palumbo. All music written by Glassjaw.

The song "Vermont Connection/The Chapter 7 Test" ends at 5:30. After 1 minute of silence (5:30 - 6:30), begins an untitled hidden track: it is a poem recited by Daryl Palumbo:

This is a new garden over old flowers,
and old makes old jokes take on the feel of the lore.
And new lips cradled sense of humor, so don't waste wishes on him.
Wish that one day they'd figure out how to shrink stars
and I could keep one in my bedroom.
And wish that me and her could grow old together.
And wish that in my next life I come back as a tiger.
These are fun wishes. In about seven minutes you can start.
'Til then, you'll just listen to the radio from seat's edge.
As if then it's the look on your face.
As if, as if then you'll matter, and then I can't wait.

Personnel
Glassjaw
 Daryl Palumbo – lead vocals
 Justin Beck – drums
 Ariel Telford– bass
 Todd Weinstock – rhythm guitar
 Kris Baldwin – lead guitar

Additional personnel
 Brian Meehan – backing vocals on track 3
 Craig Randall – production, mixing
 Shawn Baphy – mixing
 Scott Anthony – mastering

References

Glassjaw EPs
1997 debut EPs